Les Trottoirs de Bangkok (also known as Bangkok Interdit) is a 1984 French erotic thriller film directed by Jean Rollin. The film was inspired by the 1932 Boris Karloff film The Mask of Fu Manchu. The film was released in France on 24 October 1984 by Cyrile Distribution.
Hubert Toyot worked as a cameraman in this film.

In contrast to Rollin's usual themes of vampires, dream-like atmosphere and crumbling châteaus, Les Trottoirs des Bangkok mixes themes of adventure, crime and mystery with comic book dialogue, while still featuring naked women and sex, which his films were known for.

Plot
Rick, a French secret service agent, is shot and killed. His friend Jacques retrieves Rick's camera, which contains shots of a young woman named Eva. The secret service concludes that she possesses the item Rick was killed for, a deadly substance that would kill an entire city if released. The secret service fly back to Bangkok to search for Eva, who works in a local brothel. Two women break into the secret service apartment, kill a man and retrieve the film canister; these women work for an evil syndicate which is run by a lady who is also in search of Eva. Since the secret service cannot afford to fly out to Paris, the syndicate get to Eva first.

Eva is helped by Claudine, another woman who works for the syndicate, who tries to arrange for Eva to be taken away on board a cargo ship and smuggled into France. Claudine arranges the murder of a French secret service agent and poses as the dead agent's wife when Agent Roger arrives. She takes him to the nightclub, where they pretend that Eva is nowhere to be found. During this visit, the film and its nature are revealed. Claudine tries to protect Eva, but they are captured by the syndicate. Eva is chained up and whipped. Claudine tries to save her but is killed. It turns out that Rick was not murdered after all. He shows up to rescue Eva, killing everyone, then tells Eva that he must kill her too. Eva overpowers him and kills him instead.

Cast
 Yoko as Eva
 Françoise Blanchard as Claudine
 Jean-Claude Benhamou as Le Chef des Espions
 Jean-Pierre Bouyxou as Capitaine Bouyxou
 Jean-Paul Bride as Tong
 Gérard Landry as Rick
 Brigitte Borghese as Rita
 Chokie
 Michel Guibe
 Antonina Laurent
 Pierre Pattin
 Tiane Pochier
 Olivier Rollin
 André-Richard Volniévy
 Jean Rollin as Un Tueur (uncredited)

Home media
Les Trottoirs de Bangkok was released on VHS in France on 18 August 1999 by LCJ.

The film was released on DVD in the United States on 27 August 2002 by Image Entertainment in a widescreen edition, and in the United Kingdom on 28 June 2004 by Redemption Films in full frame.

References

External links
 

1984 films
1984 action thriller films
1980s crime action films
1980s crime thriller films
1980s erotic thriller films
1980s spy thriller films
Biological weapons in popular culture
Films directed by Jean Rollin
Films set in Bangkok
French action thriller films
French crime action films
French crime thriller films
French erotic thriller films
French spy thriller films
Girls with guns films
1980s French-language films
1980s French films